Southern Cross Airport refers to:

 Southern Cross Airport (New Jersey)
 Southern Cross Airport (Western Australia)